Back from the Grave is the fifth album by the Swedish death metal band Grave. It was released in 2002 on Century Media after a long hiatus.

Track listing

The first pressing of this CD contained a bonus CD containing three demos of the band

Personnel
Grave
 Ola Lindgren - Vocals, Guitars
 Jensa Paulsson - Drums
 Jonas Torndal - Guitars
 Fredrik Isaksson - Bass

Production
 Tobbe Wallström - Photography (booklet photos)
 Caroline Hoffman - Photography (band), Arrangements
 Jacek Wiśniewski - Cover art
 Henrik Jonsson - Mastering
 Tomas Skogsberg - Producer, Engineering, Editing, Mixing
 Ola Lindgren - Producer, Engineering, Editing, Mixing, Lyrics
 Carsten Drescher - Layout, Design

References

2002 albums
Grave (band) albums
Century Media Records albums